The Oregon Military Museum (OMM) at Camp Withycombe in Clackamas County, Oregon, honors, shares, and preserves Oregon’s military heritage and legacy, including the Oregon National Guard, the state’s early militias, and all branches of the US Armed Forces. Slated to open in 2023, the Museum’s main building includes the main drill floor, weapons, and temporary galleries for permanent and rotating exhibits, as well as the Conference Classroom, Museum Store, Hall of Valor, and the Thomas E. Withycombe Library. Surrounding the main building, the Historic Park, open seasonally, includes two historic buildings, the Quartermaster Storehouse and the Battery A Field Artillery Horse Barn, as well as an outdoor tracked vehicles (tanks) display. The Museum also maintains a Restoration Shop on post.

The mission of the Oregon Military Museum (https://oregonmilitarymuseum.org) is:

To inspire and educate visitors about Oregon’s military heritage and legacy to include the National Guard, the state’s early militia, and all branches of the Armed Forces.

To meet its professional stewardship obligations for the historical artifacts and archives entrusted to its care.

The Museum 

In 1975, the Oregon Military Department established the Oregon Military Museum as the official state repository for military weapons, documents, and artifacts relating to the military history of Oregon citizens. As the Museum has evolved over the years, it continues to strengthen and grow its standard of professional stewardship, preservation, outreach, education, and accessibility.

Until 2008, Oregon Military Museum collections were housed and displayed in several buildings located at Camp Withycombe, including a 6,000 sq. ft. main facility, the 1911 Battery A Field Artillery Horse Barn, and a World War II Quonset Hut. As the result of a massive base realignment process (BRAC), the Museum relocated to the 32,000 sq. ft. retired Clackamas Armory at Camp Withycombe. OMM’s move into the much larger building provides it with unique opportunities to expand operations as well as increase exhibition, collections care, program, and education spaces to better fulfill the Museum’s mission.

The Museum’s new building includes the main exhibits gallery (formerly the Armory’s drill floor), a temporary gallery for rotating exhibits, and a weapons display gallery (formerly an indoor shooting range). The Hall of Valor honors Oregon’s Medal of Honor recipients, while also serving as a space for programs and events. Completed in 2020, the Thomas E. Withycombe Library, built within the Museum’s new building, houses OMM’s library, photo, audiovisual, and archives collections.

The Collections 

The Oregon Military Museum stewards a vast collection of irreplaceable treasures reflecting Oregon’s robust military heritage and legacy. Within its permanent collection, OMM holds more than 15,000 artifacts including 50 vehicles, 750 small arms, 1,300 uniforms, and 1,000 demilitarized ordinances. The Thomas E. Withycombe Library contains over 35,000 publications and over 1,000 cubic feet of archives, photos, and audiovisuals. Together, OMM’s collections tell the many stories of Oregon's military history from pre-statehood to present day, covering wartime and humanitarian efforts, highlighting the role of the Oregon National Guard and individual Oregon service members who have played a role in the history of the state, the nation, and the world.

Since the 1970s, OMM has been amassing and preserving a collection of artifacts, archives, and images that bring Oregon’s military history to life. The Museum’s larger collections items include a Korean War era Sabre F-86 jet, a WW1 Liberty Truck, a mid-20th century OH-23 Raven helicopter, an amphibious WW2 DUKW truck, a RONS robot, and Japanese, German, and American artillery dating back to 1865. Smaller artifacts include trench art, homemade POW tools and equipment, dog tags, and uniforms from nearly every conflict. Its small arms collection is one of the largest collections publicly available west of the Mississippi River.

The Museum’s archives, photo, and audiovisual collections cover over 170 years of Oregon’s military history through primary and secondary source materials. Ranging from personal diaries, scrapbooks, and photo collections to military manuals, schematics, and reports, these collections, along with the Library’s vast collection of book, pamphlet, guides, and serial publications, provide insights into Oregon’s and Oregonians’ part in shaping and reflecting history.

Programming, Exhibits, and Resources 

The Oregon Military Museum’s outreach and education programs extend its mission to inspire and educate through community engagement and partnership. The Museum offers youth, adult, family, and veteran programming from research services to educational entertainment through programs such as: Vehicles on the Green, Story Time + Play Time on Military Time, Early Engineering with the Sons of Union Veterans, the Military Vehicle Convoy, Blacksmithing with Battery A, and Living History Day. Career and education symposiums and events, as well as community-driven programs, also occur in partnership with the Oregon National Guard, Oregon Military Department, and other community organizations.

Slated to open in 2023, the Museum’s gallery exhibits will give visitors the opportunity to explore the people, actions, and technologies from the Indian Wars to both World Wars, from the Korean War to the International Security Assistance Force’s (ISAF) mission in Afghanistan. Exhibitions will cover all branches of the US Armed Services, including the humanitarian and military service of the Oregon National Guard. Like most museums, only a small percentage of the Museum’s artifacts collection will be on display in the permanent and rotating galleries once opened. However, opportunities to explore the histories, stories, and insights of these collections will continue to be made available. While OMM looks to provide online access to researchers and the general public in the future, staff continues to welcome research inquires.

In preparation for its grand opening in 2023, Oregon Military Museum continues to develop and build its resources, striving to make the archives, artifacts, and library collections accessible in the coming years. The Museum’s long-term goals for preserving collections and increasing accessibility include online and in-person resources such as:

 Learning Hub: A centralized space online to deep dive into subjects, stories, people, actions, and technologies represented within the collections
 Youth & School Resources: Field trip, camp, home school, and in-class curricula and activities, along with youth-centric resources
 Share Space: A place for online and onsite visitors to capture and share their stories for present and future generations
 Reference & Media Center: Onsite and online resources for research and use requests, including a controlled viewing room to engage with the Museum’s moving images, audiovisual, and slide collections

Evolution of the Oregon Military Museum  

1909: Clackamas Rifle Range is established as a training camp for the Oregon National Guard (ONG), becoming the earliest organized firing range in the state of Oregon and one of the oldest in the western United States

1911: The Quartermaster Storehouse and Battery A Horse Barn are built at the Clackamas Rifle Range for the growing post

1916: “Camp Withycombe” is first used to designate the Mexican Border Mobilization Camp at the Clackamas Rifle Range

1919: Battery A Horse Barn is used to house officers’ horses, whose names are painted above each stall and still visible over a century later

1934: Clackamas Rifle Range is designated as a federal military reservation and permanently renamed Camp Withycombe after Governor James Withycombe

1954: Future site of the Oregon Military Museum, Clackamas Armory, otherwise known as the Camp Withycombe Armory, opens on post

1975: The Oregon Military Museum (OMM) is established by the Oregon Military Department as the state’s official military history repository

1988: An ORNG detachment of 12 service members is created to support the Museum

1988: The Museum, housed in its own building for the first time after initially being housed within the Clackamas Armory, officially opens to the public with guided tours of collections items on display

1996: Battery A Field Artillery Horse Barn officially becomes part of the Museum, displaying artillery for the first time to the public

2001: OMM transitions to a civilian-led organization, hiring professional museum staff

2005: OMM celebrates its 40th anniversary since being first established as a museum in 1975

2008: After 40 years open to the public, OMM closes for Base Realignment and Closure (BRAC), making space for the 41st Infantry Division Armed Forces Reserve Center (AFRC)

2009: OMM moves into its current location, as well as its 1975 initial home, and begins the process of renovating and expanding the Camp Withycombe Armory to retrofit the building as a 21st century museum

2009: Battery A Field Artillery Horse Barn moves to the Museum’s new Historic Park area, anchoring the Park for future additions

2009: OMM moves its recently acquired WW2 era Quonset Hut (Q-Hut), once used on post and by OMM’s former foundation, into its Historic Park

2014: The Quartermaster Storehouse, one of the first structures built on Camp Withycombe and recently acquired by the Museum, moves to its current location in the Historic Park after nearly being demolished

2016: The Museum’s detachment deactivates with the retirement of Chief Warrant Officer Robert Ryan and transitions to a corps of skilled restoration volunteers

2019: All elements of the Oregon Military Museum’s Historic Park are in place—Battery A Field Artillery Horse Barn, Quartermaster Storehouse, and the newly-installed multi-tank display

2019: OMM marks 10 years since being open to the public while it continues to unpack from the 2009 move and manage building renovations, along with continuing collections care, restoration, and research services

2019: Renovation of the Quartermaster Storehouse as an interpretive center is completed but not yet open to the public

2020: OMM’s main building remodel is completed, including the renovation of the drill floor and mess hall into exhibit gallery spaces, the installation of the Thomas E. Withycombe Library, and the addition of the lobby and Hall of Valor

2022: The Museum opens its Historic Park to the public for the first time with a weekly schedule, including a wider array of programs and services with the help of a growing Volunteer Corps

2022: OMM begins design of its first generation and rotating exhibits while hosting events in its Education Wing and event spaces

2022: The Museum becomes the official repository of the 41st Infantry Division

2023: OMM fully reopens to the public after a 15-year hiatus, including gallery exhibits, educational outreach programs, and onsite research services

2025: The Oregon Military Museum, now in its new home and expanded to include its Historic Park, celebrates its 50th anniversary since first established as a museum and the state’s official military history repository

Oregon Military Museum Project 

The Oregon Military Museum Project (OMMP) is the Museum’s 501(c)(3) auxiliary organization, providing development support for the Museum's long-term financial stability. Working in coordination with the Military Museum Support Council and the Oregon Military Department, OMMP (https://oregonmilitarymuseumproject.org/) provides support with long-term planning for a museum endowment and financial sustainability for the ongoing operation and evolution of the Museum.

References

External links 
Oregon Military Museum
Oregon Military Museum Project

Military history of Oregon
Military and war museums in Oregon
History museums in Oregon
Museums in Clackamas County, Oregon
Museums established in 1975
1975 establishments in Oregon
National Guard (United States) museums